Arzil Rural District is in Kharvana District of Varzaqan County, East Azerbaijan province, Iran. At the National Census of 2006, its population was 4,296 in 1,073 households. There were 4,060 inhabitants in 1,160 households at the following census of 2011. At the most recent census of 2016, the population of the rural district was 4,855 in 1,550 households. The largest of its 16 villages was Andergan, with 1,162 people.

References 

Varzaqan County

Rural Districts of East Azerbaijan Province

Populated places in East Azerbaijan Province

Populated places in Varzaqan County